The China Masters, formerly known as Fuzhou China Open, is an annual badminton tournament held in China. It became part of the BWF Super Series tournaments in 2007. In 2014 the level of the tournament was downgraded to BWF Grand Prix Gold because, although China bid in the autumn of 2012 to continue to host 2 BWF Super Series tournaments, the Changzhou bid was unsuccessful and the China Masters was replaced for the 2014–2017 Superseries cycle by the Australian Open. In 2018, the tournament became a part of World Tour Grade 2 Level 3 tournament (BWF World Tour Super 750) and acquire its current name. From 2023 onwards, this will be held in Shenzhen, and its name will be changed back to its former name, China Masters.

Past winners

Performances by nation

References

External links
BWF: China Masters

 
Badminton tournaments in China
BWF World Tour